Kai Walter (born 1973) is a German slalom canoeist who competed from the late 1990s to the early 2000s.

He won a silver medal in the C2 team event at the 2002 ICF Canoe Slalom World Championships in Bourg St.-Maurice. He also won a bronze medal in the same event at the 2002 European Championships in Bratislava.

His partner throughout his international career was Frank Henze.

World Cup individual podiums

References

German male canoeists
Living people
1973 births
Medalists at the ICF Canoe Slalom World Championships